is a railway station in the town of Tanagura, Fukushima, Japan operated by East Japan Railway Company (JR East).

Lines

Station layout
The station has one island platform connected to the station building by a footbridge. The station has a Midori no Madoguchi staffed ticket office.

Platforms

History
Iwaki-Tanakura Station opened on November 29, 1916 as a station on the Hakuho Raukway. The Japan Government Railway's Suigun Line connected to the station on November 11, 1932, and the Hakuho Railway was nationalized on May 1, 1941, and suspension of service as Hakuhō Line on December 11, 1944. The station was absorbed into the JR East network upon the privatization of the Japanese National Railways (JNR) on April 1, 1987.

Bus routes
JR BUS KANTO Hakuhō Line
For Shin-Shirakawa Station via Shirakawa Station
For Sobo'oka
Fukushima Transportation
For Higashidate Station via Iwaki-Hanawa Station
For Iwaki-Ishikawa Station

Passenger statistics
In fiscal 2018, the station was used by an average of 166 passengers daily (boarding passengers only).

Surrounding area
Tanagura Town Hall
Tanagura Post Office
site of Tanagura Castle

See also
 List of Railway Stations in Japan

References

External links

  

Stations of East Japan Railway Company
Railway stations in Fukushima Prefecture
Suigun Line
Railway stations in Japan opened in 1916
Tanagura, Fukushima